LKT Team Brandenburg is a German UCI Continental cycling team founded in 2008.

Team roster

Major wins
2013
Stages 3, 4 & 5 Tour de Berlin, Willi Willwohl
Stage 6 Dookoła Mazowsza, Willi Willwohl
2014
Stage 1 Carpathia Couriers Path, Willi Willwohl
Stage 2 Dookoła Mazowsza, Tim Reske
2015
Sprints classification Cycling Tour of Sibiu, Robert Kessler
Stage 3 Dookoła Mazowsza, Willi Willwohl
2019
Stage 5 Bałtyk–Karkonosze Tour, Christian Koch

National champions
2017
 German U23 Time Trial, Richard Banusch

References

External links

Cycling teams established in 2008
Cycling teams based in Germany
UCI Continental Teams (Europe)